Sheikh Ali Orumian is an Iranian Ayatollah born in 1932 in Maragheh. He Served in the Second and Third terms of the Assembly of Experts, as well as the second term for the Islamic Consultative Assembly representing East Azerbaijan Province.

Biography 

Ali Orumian was born to a family in Maragheh in 1932. Through his early years he was learning the Quran as well his usual lessons in school. It was until he was in High School he decided to attend the Maragheh Theological School where he was being taught by Sheikh Aziz Adib. He then travelled to Qom to attend the Qom Seminary to further his Islamic knowledge. In Qom, he was taught by Mirza Muslim Malakouti. After spending some time in Qom, he decided to migrate to Najaf and continue his Islamic education in Hawza Najaf where he would spend most of his learning years in regards to Islamic jurisprudence. While in Najaf, he was taught by Abu al-Qasim al-Khoei, Muhsin al-Hakim, Mahmoud Shahroudi as well as Ruhollah Khomeini. However, he became very close to Ayatollah Shirazi and Ayatollah Khoei while in studying Najaf, and would attend their lectures quite frequently. He even wrote summaries of their lectures which he has published in Najaf After spending 19 years in Najaf, he decided to return to Maragheh in 1973. During the ongoing political climate in Iran, he gave Khutbahs (Islamic Sermons) on the Minbar (pulpit) about the Pahlavi regime which lead to him being sent to the police station for interrogation by SAVAK, and the eventual banning from giving lectures on the pulpit until the 1979 Iranian revolution.

After the revolution he served two terms in the Assembly of Experts as well as serving the second term of the Islamic Consultative Assembly. Three of his sons, Mehdi, Reza, and Mohsen died in combat during the Iran–Iraq War. His fourth son was badly injured during Operation Kheibar in Majnoon Island.

Works 

 Tanqih al-Usool (Kitab al-Istishab)
 Lectures of Ayatollah Shirazi
 Lectures of Ayatollah Khoei
 Philosophy of Fasting
 Discussions in Jurisprudence of Ayatollah Shirazi
 A Treatise of Friday Prayers

See also 

 List of members in the Second Term of the Council of Experts
 List of members in the Third Term of the Council of Experts
 List of Ayatollahs
 Abdullah Musawi Shirazi
 Karamatollah Malek-Hosseini

References 

Living people
1932 births
20th-century Iranian politicians
Members of the Assembly of Experts
People from Maragheh
Iranian ayatollahs